Nanxun Christian Church is a Protestant church located in Nanxun District of Huzhou, Zhejiang, China.

History
The introduction of Christianity into the Nanxun area began in 1860, belonging to the American Methodist Episcopal Mission.

In 1927, American Christian Slote appropriated USD$30 million for building the Church. It was named "Slote Church" in memory of her after completion. Yu Zhizhai was the first rectorship and Tang Musan was the first archpriest.

After the defeat of the Nationalists by the Communists in Chinese Civil War in 1949, Nanxun Christian Church under the jurisdiction of the Communist Government. Religious activities had been forced to stop in the following year. In 1958 the Church was used as residential building for locals.

In 1966, Mao Zedong launched the ten-year Cultural Revolution, the Red Guards had attacked the Church and it was spared destruction and was boarded up till 1986.

After the 3rd Plenary Session of the 11th Central Committee of the Communist Party of China, the policy of religious freedom was implemented in 1986. On 29 March 1987, the Church held the first Sunday Services since 1950. In December that same year, Lü Haisheng was proposed as the new director of its Management Committee. In October 1992, Wang Jinkang replaced Lü Haisheng as the second director.

Gallery

References

Bibliography

 

Buildings and structures in Huzhou
Churches in Zhejiang
Tourist attractions in Huzhou
1927 establishments in China
Protestant churches in China
Churches completed in 1927